The 930s decade ran from January 1, 930, to December 31, 939.

Significant people
 Al-Muqtadir
 Constantine VII
 Pope John XI
 Pope Leo VII
 Al-Qahir
 Al-Radi
 Al-Ash'ari

References